Joshua Smith (born March 10, 1992) is an American soccer player who currently plays for Irish club Galway United in the League of Ireland First Division.

Career
After spending time with SC Idar-Oberstein in 2011 and 2012, Smith returned to the United States to play college soccer  at the University of San Francisco between 2013 and 2016. While at San Francisco, Smith made 71 appearances and scored 5 goals.

While at San Francisco, Smith appeared for USL PDL sides San Jose Earthquakes U23 and Burlingame Dragons.

Professional
On January 17, 2017, Smith was selected in the fourth round (75th overall) of the 2017 MLS SuperDraft by New England Revolution. He signed with the club on March 1, 2017. He was released on November 27, 2017.

Smith officially signed for SC Hessen Dreieich in Germany on 12 February 2018.

After leaving Germany, Smith signed for Finn Harps F.C. in the League of Ireland Premier Division in July 2019, scoring his first goal for the club in a 1-0 win over Waterford F.C. in October.

On 17 December 2019, Smith signed with Galway United F.C.

References

External links

1992 births
Living people
People from Vernon Parish, Louisiana
Soccer players from Louisiana
American soccer players
Association football defenders
San Francisco Dons men's soccer players
San Jose Earthquakes U23 players
Burlingame Dragons FC players
New England Revolution draft picks
New England Revolution players
SC Hessen Dreieich players
Finn Harps F.C. players
Galway United F.C. players
USL League Two players
Major League Soccer players
League of Ireland players
United States men's youth international soccer players
American expatriate soccer players
American expatriate soccer players in Germany